Shankharibazar massacre was a massacre of over 212 Bengali Hindus in the Shankharibazar area of Old Dhaka in East Pakistan on 26 March 1971 by the Pakistani occupation army. The survivors fled to the villages on the other side of the Buriganga, in the region now known as Keraniganj. Shankharibazar became deserted and dead bodies remained on the streets for quite a long time. The Pakistani establishment renamed the Shankharibazar Road to Tikka Khan Road.

Background 
Shankharibazar is a Hindu locality in the heart of Old Dhaka. It is inhabited by the Shankharis, a Bengali Hindu caste still engaged in their traditional vocation of preparation of conch shell bangles from conch shells.

The Pakistani occupation army camped at the Jagannath College and Brahmo Samaj, very near to the Shankharibazar Road. During the Operation Searchlight, Shankharibazar became the prime target of the Pakistani army.

Events 
On the evening of 25 March, the Pakistani army took to the streets. They proceeded towards Sadar Ghat along the Nawabpur Road. At the crossing of Shankharibazar Road, they shelled a house, as a result of which a portion of the house got destroyed. Three people died in the shelling and five to six people were injured.

On the afternoon of 26 March, the Pakistani army attacked Shankharibazar. They entered premises no. 47 and killed the father and younger brother of the family. The elder brother Amar Sur, who survived the massacre fled through the narrow lane in the rear of the house. The military men ordered the residents to come out of their houses. Then they came out they were shot to death. The Pakistani army continued their killing spree in the premises of the locality and killed around 50 Hindus. More than 200 Hindus were injured in the assault. The houses were set on fire. According to eyewitness accounts, 31 Hindus were killed in the residence of Chandan Sur alone. Chandan Sur was one of the established and influential men in the area. Before the elections, Khwaja Khairuddin of the Dhaka Nawab family had unsuccessfully tried to coerce Sur on his side. Khairuddin was contesting the elections against Sheikh Mujibur Rahman. It has been alleged that during the massacre, Khwaja Khairuddin led the Pakistani military to the residence of Chandan Sur. According to Kalidas Baidya, 126 Hindus from the neighbourhood were rounded up in one house and shot to death.

Aftermath 
Shankharibazar became a deserted locality. The Pakistani occupation army and their local collaborators looted the gold, jewellery and furniture in the houses. The Bihari Muslims occupied the houses and settled in the locality. The Pakistani establishment renamed the Shankharibazar Road to Tikka Khan Road. The survivors returned to their locality after the liberation of Bangladesh. By then the entire locality was in ruins. The Shankharis had to start the struggle of life afresh.

Memorial 
In 1972, a memorial was erected on the eastern end of the Shankharibazar Road in memory of the victims of the Shankharibazar massacre. Sheikh Mujibur Rahman promised the family of the victims a compensation sum of 2,000 Taka, however the victim's family members haven't received any compensation till date. In 1997, on the occasion silver jubilee of Liberation of Bangladesh, the Shankharibazar published a souvenir where the names of the massacre victims were published.

References 

1971 in Bangladesh
Massacres in 1971
1971 Bangladesh genocide
Old Dhaka
Persecution of Hindus
Persecution by Muslims
Massacres of Bengali Hindus in East Pakistan
Massacres committed by Pakistan in East Pakistan
March 1971 events in Bangladesh
Massacres of Bengalis